The 2014 MTV Movie Awards were held on April 13, 2014 at the Nokia Theatre in Los Angeles, California. The show was hosted by late-night personality Conan O'Brien. The nominees were announced on the morning of March 6, 2014.
The awards ceremony took place on April 13. Zendaya, Tyler Posey, and MTV News personalities Josh Horowitz and Christina Garibaldi co-hosted the pre-show.

Opening scene cameos
In the pre-recorded, opening scene of the show, 50 celebrities (including O'Brien) made cameos. Those included (in order of appearance): Andy Samberg, Seth Rogen, Sarah Silverman, Ice Cube, Elijah Wood, Chris Pratt, Jessica Alba, Ashton Kutcher, Anna Faris, Danny McBride, Ed Helms, Jason Bateman, Lupita Nyong'o, Adam Sandler, Russell Crowe, Jennifer Connelly, Emma Watson, Anthony Hopkins, Logan Lerman, Shaun White, Rosario Dawson, Willie Nelson, Blake Griffin, Taylor Swift, Martin Scorsese, James Franco, Paul Rudd, Aziz Ansari, Grumpy Cat, Carrie Brownstein, Fred Armisen, Skrillex, Demi Moore, Tracy Morgan, Tom Arnold, Simon Helberg, Melissa Rauch, Mayim Bialik, Johnny Galecki, Jim Parsons, Kunal Nayyar, Kaley Cuoco, Mindy Kaling, Adam Scott, Elliot Page, Charles Barkley, Jack Nicholson, Katy Perry, and Jack White.

Performers
Conan O'Brien and Adam DeVine — Opening number
Twenty One Pilots — "Car Radio"
Eminem and Rihanna — "The Monster"
Ellie Goulding, Zedd, Matthew Koma, and Miriam Bryant— "Beating Heart" / "Find You"

Presenters
Lupita Nyong'o – presented Best On-Screen Transformation
Seth MacFarlane and Amanda Seyfried – presented Best Comedic Performance
Shaliene Woodley and Ansel Elgort – introduced Twenty One Pilots
Chris Pratt – presented reminder to vote for Movie of the Year
Jared Leto – presented Best Villain
Rita Ora and Jessica Alba – presented Best Shirtless Performance
Elliot Page – presented sneak peek to X-Men: Days of Future Past
Mila Kunis and Jonah Hill – presented MTV Trailblazer Award
Orlando Bloom – introduced Eminem and Rihanna
Seth Rogen, Zac Efron, and Dave Franco – presented Best Kiss
Cameron Diaz, Leslie Mann, Nicki Minaj, and Kate Upton – presented Best Male Performance
Jordana Brewster – presented tribute to Paul Walker
Aaron Taylor-Johnson – presented Best Fight
Adrian Grenier, Jerry Ferrara, and Kevin Dillon – presented MTV Generation Award
Andrew Garfield, Emma Stone, and Jamie Foxx – presented exclusive clip from The Amazing Spider-Man 2
Miles Teller and Iggy Azalea – introduced Ellie Goulding and Zedd
Johnny Depp – presented Best Movie of the Year

Nominations

Films with multiple nominations 
The following films received multiple nominations:

 Eight - American Hustle, The Wolf of Wall Street, and The Hunger Games: Catching Fire
 Six - We're the Millers
 Four - 12 Years a Slave, Anchorman 2: The Legend Continues, Dallas Buyers Club, The Hobbit: The Desolation of Smaug, and This Is the End
 Two - Identity Thief, Iron Man 3, Ride Along, The Spectacular Now, and Thor: The Dark World

Individuals with multiple nominations 
The following individuals received multiple nominations:

 Five - Leonardo DiCaprio (The Wolf of Wall Street)
 Four - Jennifer Lawrence (American Hustle and The Hunger Games: Catching Fire)
 Three - Amy Adams (American Hustle), Jennifer Aniston (We're The Millers), Matthew McConaughey (Dallas Buyers Club), Jonah Hill (The Wolf of Wall Street and This is the End), Melissa McCarthy (Identity Thief and The Heat), and Will Poulter (We're the Millers)
 Two - Tina Fey (Anchorman 2: The Legend Continues), Amy Poehler  (Anchorman 2: The Legend Continues), Kanye West (Anchorman 2: The Legend Continues), Steve Carell (Anchorman 2: The Legend Continues), Will Ferrell (Anchorman 2: The Legend Continues), Paul Rudd (Anchorman 2: The Legend Continues), David Koechner (Anchorman 2: The Legend Continues), Jared Leto (Dallas Buyers Club) Orlando Bloom (The Hobbit: The Desolation of Smaug), Chris Hemsworth (Thor: The Dark World), Kevin Hart (Ride Along), Seth Rogen (This is the End), Channing Tatum (This is the End and White House Down), Christian Bale (American Hustle), and Miles Teller (The Spectacular Now)

Multiple winners
Three – The Hunger Games: Catching Fire
Two – We're the Millers, The Wolf of Wall Street, and This Is the End

Awards
The winners are in bold. An asterisk (*) indicates that the winners were announced during the pre-show.

MTV Generation Award
 Mark Wahlberg

MTV Trailblazer Award
 Channing Tatum

Tribute
 Paul Walker

Notes

References

External links
 MTV Movie Awards official site

MTV Movie & TV Awards
MTV Movie Awards
MTV Movie
2014 in Los Angeles
2014 in American cinema